The Lloyd Expressway is a major east-west traffic artery located in Vanderburgh County, Indiana.  The route primarily runs through Evansville, Indiana, reaching from Interstate 69 on the east side of the city to the Posey County line west of the city limits.  West of US 41, the expressway is signed as Indiana State Road 62 (SR 62).  East of US 41, it is signed as Indiana State Road 66 (SR 66).

History 

Before the expressway was built, east-west traffic across Evansville was handled by a pair of streets: Division Street to the east of Main Street, and Pennsylvania Avenue to the west.  These roads were congested and dangerous.  For a short stretch, Division Street ran in tandem with a busy railroad track.  The unacceptable condition of this route necessitated an expressway.

The road was built in stages.  The west section of the expressway was completed in the 1950s, ending at Fulton Avenue with plans to continue it further east at a later date.  It wasn't until the 1970s and 80s that local officials succeeded in securing federal funding to finish construction.  Key to this effort was popular Evansville mayor Russell G. Lloyd, Sr., who was assassinated in 1980 after he had left office.  The expressway is named in his honor.

In the spring of 1983, buildings in the expressway's path were demolished, and construction began on July 29, 1983.  Five years later, the road finally opened on July 19, 1988.  Construction on the eastern phase cost $160 million.

Since opening, the state has made gradual improvements to the road.  In 2008, construction began on a $32 million diamond interchange at Fulton Avenue near downtown.  This replaced the at-grade signaled intersection that was there previously.  In 2014, a $19 million project was started to reconfigure the interchange with US 41 from a partial cloverleaf, with traffic lights on the Lloyd Expressway, into a full cloverleaf with no signals.  There have been proposals for similar projects on other high-traffic intersections, such as Burkhardt Road.

Route description 

As one travels along the expressway, upon reaching US 41, one state highway — SR 62 if traveling east or SR 66 if traveling west — leaves the expressway while the other joins the expressway.  (To the north, SR 62 and SR 66 both run concurrently with US 41 and eventually turn off in opposite directions).

The expressway contains a mix of intersections and interchanges.  Because the route includes several at-grade intersections with stoplights, Evansville residents sometimes use the term "expressway" derisively, or drop it altogether and call it "the Lloyd" instead or even referring to it as "Lloyd Boulevard". Nevertheless, the road actually has many characteristics that fit the standard definition of "expressway."  Opposing traffic is separated between intersections and interchanges, largely by medians.  There are few driveways along the route, with most access made via side roads.  Most driveways that do exist are restricted to right-in/right-out access only.

Along much of its route, especially near the downtown area, the expressway is bordered by Division Street along the north side of the road and John Street along the south side of the road.  These two streets act as frontage roads for the expressway; many of the on-ramps and off-ramps from the highway connect with Division Street or John Street instead of the road actually labeled on the exit sign.  This allows drivers to continue on to other streets that do not have their own exits.

Major intersections

References

External links 

Roads in Indiana
Transportation in Evansville, Indiana